Estadio Olímpico Metropolitano is a multi-purpose stadium in San Pedro Sula, Honduras.  It is currently used mostly for football matches and also has facilities for athletics. It has a capacity of 37,325.

History
It was built in 1997 for the sixth edition of the Central American Games held there. This stadium was built by Jerónimo Sandoval, mostly known by "Chombo Sandoval", he was the organizer of the 1997 Central American Olympic Games in San Pedro Sula, which caused many controversies.
After its completion the stadium became the largest in the country dispatching Estadio Nacional's of that title. It has been the home for Honduras national football team since the 1998 FIFA World Cup qualification, with Estadio Nacional hosting some games on and off. Upon Sandoval building the stadium, he noticed that the front of the stadium displayed a large "H" by coincidence. When this was discovered, the figure was painted blue to represent the colours of the Honduras national football team.

Before leaving office, San Pedro Sula's former mayor, Oscar Kilgore, attempted to change the name of the stadium to José de la Paz Herrera, a prominent Honduran football coach and only coach at the time that had taken Honduras to a World Cup. The move was heavily opposed by Club Deportivo Marathón and eventually abandoned.

Matches 
First League game: March 1, 1998. Olimpia 3-2 Marathón with winning goals from Denilson Costa, Dolmo Flores and Rudy Williams. For Marathón, Juan 'Montuca' Castro and Jaime Rosales.

References

External links 
 Photos of the construction of the stadium
 Amateur capacity Metropolitan Olympic Stadium
 References of the Metropolitan Stadium
 Statistics of the Metropolitan Stadium 
 International Reference
 Sanctions for the Metropolitan Olympic Stadium by FIFA
 The Honduras Press confirms the capacity of the Olympic Stadium for the qualifiers.

1997 establishments in Honduras
Olimpico Metropolitano, Estadio
Olimpico Metropolitano, Estadio
Multi-purpose stadiums in Honduras
Sports venues completed in 1997